Benchetrit is a surname. Notable people with the surname include: 

Elliot Benchetrit (born 1998), French tennis player
Ohad Benchetrit, Canadian musician
Samuel Benchetrit (born 1973), French writer, actor, scenarist, and director